The 2005 NBL season was the 24th season of the National Basketball League. The Auckland Stars won the championship in 2005 to claim their ninth league title.

Summary

Regular season standings

Playoff bracket

Awards

Player of the Week

Statistics leaders
Stats as of the end of the regular season

Regular season
 Most Valuable Player: Lindsay Tait (Auckland Stars)
 NZ Most Valuable Player: Lindsay Tait (Auckland Stars)
 Most Outstanding Guard: Lindsay Tait (Auckland Stars)
 Most Outstanding NZ Guard: Lindsay Tait (Auckland Stars)
 Most Outstanding Forward: Casey Frank (Auckland Stars) & Jacob Holmes (Nelson Giants)
 Most Outstanding NZ Forward/Centre: Mika Vukona (Nelson Giants)
 Scoring Champion: Greg Lewis (Waikato Titans)
 Rebounding Champion: David Cooper (Manawatu Jets)
 Assist Champion: Paul Henare (Hawke's Bay Hawks)
 Young Player of the Year: Jarrod Kenny (Harbour Heat)
 Coach of the Year: Nenad Vučinić (Nelson Giants)
 All-Star Five:
 G: Paul Henare (Hawke's Bay Hawks)
 G: Lindsay Tait (Auckland Stars)
 F: Greg Lewis (Waikato Titans)
 F: Jacob Holmes (Nelson Giants)
 C: Casey Frank (Auckland Stars)

Playoffs
 Final MVP: Dillon Boucher (Auckland Stars)

References

External links
Basketball New Zealand 2005 Results Annual
2005 League Handbook
2005 season links

National Basketball League (New Zealand) seasons
NBL